Katina (born 1975) is a female orca (killer whale) who lives in SeaWorld Orlando in Florida. She was captured off Iceland at approximately three years of age on October 26, 1978. She is the most successful breeding female orca in captivity.

Transfers
Upon her capture, Katina was purchased by Marineland in Niagara Falls, Ontario, Canada, where she was first named Kandu 6. She was shipped to the facility soon after. However, she did not spend much time there. Sometime between April and June 1979, Katina was bought by SeaWorld. She was sent to their park in San Diego. In 1982, Katina was moved to the park in Ohio with another female named Kasatka, with whom she was captured in 1978. For two years, the two would perform in the Ohio park during the summer months and then be moved back to San Diego for the winter. Finally, in September or October 1984, Katina was transferred to the SeaWorld in Orlando. She has remained there ever since.

Family members/breed
Daughters: Kalina*(1985–2010), Katerina*(1988–1999), Unna*(1996–2015) and Nalani(2006)
Sons: Taku*(1993–2007), Ikaika (2002), and Makaio (2010)
Granddaughters: Kalina's stillborn*, Skyla*(2004–2021), Unna's stillborn*, and Nalani (2006)
Grandsons: Keet(1993), Keto (1995), Tuar(1999), and Trua(2005)
Unknown grandchildren: Unna's two unconfirmed pregnancies*
Great-granddaughters: Kalia(2004), Halyn* (2005–2008) Vicky*(2012–2013) and Ula*(2018–2021) 
Great-grandson: Adán(2010)
Unconfirmed great-grandson: Kayla's miscarriage*
Unconfirmed great-granddaughter: Unna's stillborn* 
Unconfirmed unknown great-grandchildren: Unna's two unconfirmed pregnancies*
Great-great-granddaughter: Amaya*(2014–2021)
Possible Relatives: Betty*
Ecotype: 100% Icelandic

Birth of Kalina

Katina became pregnant in early spring of 1984 at SeaWorld San Diego. She had mated with a male named Winston. Soon afterward, she was moved back to Sea World Ohio in Aurora, Ohio for the summer. While there, the trainers soon realized she was pregnant. Because of this, she was moved to Orlando in the end of the summer season. This is where she gave birth.

On September 26, 1985, Katina went into labor. A few hours later, she bore her first calf—a female, who was named Kalina. Although ten Orca calves had been born in captivity prior to Kalina, none of them had survived past a few weeks. This made Kalina the first Orca calf to be successfully born and raised in captivity, which made Katina the first successful mother. The success of the captive Orca breeding program began with Katina in 1985. Kalina went on to live for 25 years, before she died at SeaWorld Orlando in October 2010.

Katina's other calves and grandchildren
In early 1987, an adult male Orca named Kanduke arrived in Orlando. He and Katina soon mated. Katina bore her second calf on November 4, 1988. It was another female named Katerina.  In early 1991, Katerina was moved to Texas. Katerina died on May 5, 1999 at SeaWorld San Antonio in Texas at 10.5 years of age.

A male named Tilikum came to SeaWorld in January 1992.  It wasn't long before Katina was pregnant again.  She gave birth to her first son on September 9, 1993; the calf was named Taku. Katina has given birth to seven calves in all, of whom five have been taken from her and shipped other theme parks. Four have died. In the wild, male orcas leave the pod in order to mate. But Taku, Katina’s son, impregnated his mother when he reached sexual maturity. To date, their calf, Nalani, lives with her at SeaWorld Orlando. Taku himself passed away in 2007, several months after being separated from Katina. 

Just seven months prior to Taku's birth, Katina's older daughter Kalina gave birth to her first calf, Keet, on February 2, 1993, thus making Katina a grandmother. Keet was born in SeaWorld San Antonio, where Kalina resided at the time.

Katina's next calf came on December 27, 1996.  It was a female and she was named Unna. Her fifth calf was a male born on August 25, 2002; he would later be named Ikaika. Unna, Ikaika, and Taku were all fathered by Tilikum. Unna later died on December 21, 2015.

Katina gave birth to her sixth calf on September 18, 2006. The baby was a female and was named Nalani

On October 9, 2010, Katina gave birth to her seventh calf and her third son, Makaio, just five days after her first offspring Kalina died. He was sired by Tilikum, who had already fathered three of her previous children.

Besides Keet, Kalina has three other calves: Keto (male; born 1995), Tuar (male; born 1999), and Skyla (female; born 2004 died 2021).  Her son Taku fathered a male calf named Trua whom was born to Takara on November 23, 2005. Keet, Kalina's oldest calf, has fathered two daughters of his own: Kalia (2004) and Halyn* (2005–2008), making Katina the first ever great-grandmother at SeaWorld. Keto, Kalina's second son, had a son Adán in (2010) and his first daughter Victoria (2012-2013). On December 2, 2014 at 12:34 pm, Kalia gave birth to Katina's first great-great grandchild, Amaya, sired by Ulises.

Katina currently 
Katina is about 46 years old and is one of the most successful Orcas in history at SeaWorld.  Measuring about 17 feet and weighing in at about 5,200 pounds, Katina is on the small side compared to most other females, but she is rather bulky.  She is an excellent performer and is very reliable.  She is one of their principal whales for performances and is used daily. Katina is generally very relaxed, sweet-natured and patient and has never been involved in any known incidents with one of her handlers.

Being the matriarch of the orcas, Katina is rather dominant.  She can sometimes, although rarely, be stubborn and refuse to perform. When this happens, usually all of the other orcas follow suit.

Katina only lives with two of her children (Makaio and Nalani) and her grandson (Trua). She was usually with her daughter (Nalani) but was also with Takara and Trua quite often up until Takara was transferred to SeaWorld San Antonio. A new female named Kayla arrived in Orlando from SeaWorld San Antonio. She and Katina spend a lot of time together. Seaworld announced on May 18, 2010 that Katina was pregnant again by Tilikum. She gave birth to Makaio at 7:28 pm on Saturday October 9, 2010. It was determined a male on October 18, 2010. As of December 2010 Makaio was 7 feet long and weighed approximately 550 pounds.

See also
 List of individual cetaceans

References

1975 animal births
Individual orcas